Euphorbia wallichii, the Wallich spurge (Nepali: डुक), is a species of plant in the family Euphorbiaceae indigenous to the Himalaya, growing from Pakistan to Yunnan at elevations between 2300–3700 m.

References

wallichii
Flora of Nepal
Taxa named by Joseph Dalton Hooker